Aaron Fink (born March 10, 1955) is an artist working in a variety of mediums including oil, prints, sculpture and works on paper.

Early life and education
Fink was born in Boston, Massachusetts. He is the son of artist Barbara Swan. He received a BFA from the Maryland Institute College of Art in Baltimore in 1977 and an MFA from Yale University in 1979.

Career in art
Fink was an artist-in-residence at Anderson Ranch, Snowmass, Colorado, in 1996 and 1998. Fink received grants from the National Endowment for the Arts in 1982 and 1987. In 1984 he was awarded an Artist Fellowship from the Massachusetts Council on the Arts and Humanities, and in 1979 he was an Alternate in Painting for the Prix de Rome.

Fink in the early 1980s was part of a group of artists associated with a new wave of Boston Expressionism. His first solo exhibition was held at the Hayden Corridor Gallery at the Massachusetts Institute of Technology. His paintings often depict real-life objects embued with enhanced color and contrast for a super-lifelike effect.

Publications

Public collections

References

1955 births
Living people
Artists from Boston
Maryland Institute College of Art alumni
Yale School of Art alumni